Shangba Tujia Ethnic Township is a township in Daozhen Gelao and Miao Autonomous County, Guizhou, China.

Administrative division
As of 2016, the township is divided into three villages: 
 Bayi
 Xintianba
 Shuanghe

Economy
The town's economy is based on nearby mineral resources and agricultural resources. Mineral resources in the township are coal, iron, and silicate. Economic crops include Kiwifruit and medicinal materials.

Tourist attractions
The main attraction is a karst cave named "Xianmi Cave".

References

Bibliography

Townships of Zunyi